Sudhin Choksey (born 31 January 1954) is the executive director (designate) of Bandhan Bank and former managing director & CEO of Gruh Finance Limited. He is considered as one of the foremost authority in affordable housing finance and mortgage insurance in India.

Career 

Choksey joined GRUH Finance Limited in 1993 as General Manager of the company. He was appointed as an executive director on the Board of the company in May 1996. He was appointed as CEO of the company in November 1998 and then as managing director in June 2000. In 2019, he led the merger of GRUH Finance with Bandhan Bank. Post-merger, he joined the latter as an executive director (designate).

In 2014, Choksey joined the National Taskforce on Rural Housing and Habitat set up by Ministry of Rural Development (India) for rural housing finance.

Affordable Housing Market 

Choksey is considered as one of the advocates for affordable housing in India. Often, he has supported various socio-economic researches and piloted affordable housing projects in rural part of Gujarat. His views on the dynamics of Indian housing market are regularly the part of business news broadcast such as; BloombergQuint, BTVI, CNBC TV18, ET Now and NDTV Profit.

Awards 

Choksey was the recipient of the Institute of Chartered Accountants of India Business Leader Financial Services Award for the Year 2015.

See also 

 Bandhan Bank
 Housing Development Finance Corporation

References 

Chief executives in the finance industry
Indian business executives
Indian chief executives